The New Cross Rangers were a  Speedway team which operated from 1934 until their closure in 1953. They also rode as the New Cross Lambs from 1934 to 1935 and then the New Cross Tamers in 1936. The team were League Champions in 1938 and 1948.

History
The team started when promoter Fred Mockford relocated his Crystal Palace team at the end of the 1933 season. Originally known as the New Cross Lambs from 1934 to 1935 and then the New Cross Tamers in 1936. In 1935 Tom Farndon was killed after crashing at the stadium and in 1937, New Cross Rangers rider Jack Milne from America won the second ever Speedway World Championship.

New Cross Stadium was used as a film set for some of the action and crowd scenes for the 1949 film "Once a Jolly Swagman" which starred Dirk Bogarde.

Before The track reopened in 1959 under Johnnie Hoskins for a series of open meetings and then in 1960 and 1961 operated in the National League. After closing at the end of the 1961 season they re-opened again under Pete Lansdale and Wally Mawdsley in the Provincial League in 1963, but had to close down before completing the season. . The track was often referred to as 'The Frying Pan'. It was built inside the greyhound track and had banking all the way round.

Season summary

Notable riders

References

Defunct British speedway teams
Speedway teams in London